Beware of the Storybook Wolves is a 2000 picture book written by Lauren Child. It is about Herb, a little boy, who has an adventure with a number of characters, including a couple of wolves, from his fairy tale books.

Reception
Booktrust, in a review of Beware of the Storybook Wolves, wrote "A simple story, well told, but it is the adventurous artwork that makes this book stand out."

The Horn Book Magazine wrote "While the concept is innovative and the conclusion is satisfying, the overlong text trips on its own cleverness."

Beware of the Storybook Wolves has also been reviewed by Booklist, School Library Journal  Kirkus Reviews, Publishers Weekly, and Books for Keeps. 

It was awarded a 2000 bronze Smarties Book Prize.

References

External links
Library holdings of Beware of the Storybook Wolves

2000 children's books
Fictional wolves
British picture books
Books about wolves
Picture books based on fairy tales